Rangers TV is the official television channel of Scottish football club Rangers F.C. Initially launched in 2004 as a satellite and cable TV channel, it has operated online since 2009.

History

Setanta Sports
Launched in 2004, the channel was initially operated by Setanta Sports, and was available on satellite and cable platforms in the UK and Ireland.

The channel had TV shows showing highlights and full match replays of recent games. It also replayed full games from the past. There was also Reserves action and Rangers heroes programmes. The main show while operated by Setanta was 'Ibrox Uncovered' Which was hosted by Lindsey Archibald which was a live talk show about the latest Rangers news, broadcast each weeknight. Guests featured were Derek Ferguson, Andy Goram, Arthur Numan, Alex Rae and occasionally Willie Henderson. The show also featured Fans Phone calls twice a week.

Online
After Setanta Sports entered administration and ceased broadcasting its core channels, Rangers announced that Rangers TV has ceased broadcasting on satellite TV, but hoped there will be an opportunity to restore a dedicated Rangers TV channel in the future depending on discussions with broadcasters. On 30 October 2009 Rangers TV re-launched as an internet subscription based TV channel at rangerstv.tv. Rangers TV is now available throughout the world and broadcasts all live matches for viewers outside the UK & Republic of Ireland. Users within the British Isles can watch highlight programmes and full games after midnight of the day of the game.

References

Rangers F.C.
Football club television channels in the United Kingdom
Football mass media in Scotland
Defunct television channels in Scotland
Television channels and stations disestablished in 2009
Television channels and stations established in 2004
2004 establishments in Scotland
2009 disestablishments in Scotland